Phoenix Mountain, also known by its Chinese name Fenghuangshan, is a mountain located in Fengcheng, Dandong Prefecture, Liaoning Province, China.  Its highest peak is called Jianyan with a height of 836 meters above sea level.  Phoenix Mountain is one of Liaoning Provinces's four famous mountains, the other three being Qianshan, Yiwulü Mountain, and Yao Mountain.

See also
 Other Phoenix Mountains

References

External links
 Phoenix Mountain in Fengcheng, China (in Chinese)

Dandong
Mountains of Liaoning